2011–12 Russian Handball Super League season.

Team information

Results

Regular season

Championship round

Quarter finals

Semifinals

Finals

Relegation round

References

External links
 Scoresway

Handball competitions in Russia
2011–12 domestic handball leagues
2011 in Russian sport
2012 in Russian sport